The Oklahoma Warriors were a soccer club based in Oklahoma City, Oklahoma that competed in the SISL and USISL.

Founded in 1986 by head coach and owner Chico Villar, the Warriors played their home games at the Indoor Soccer Arena, owned by Villar.  In February 1993, the Warriors merged with the Oklahoma City Spirit of the Lone Star Soccer Alliance to become the Oklahoma City Slickers for the 1993 outdoor season.

Year-by-year

References

W
Defunct soccer clubs in Oklahoma
Defunct indoor soccer clubs in the United States
USISL teams
1986 establishments in Oklahoma
Association football clubs established in 1986
1993 disestablishments in Oklahoma
Association football clubs disestablished in 1993